Poinachi is a small town on National Highway 66, about 16 km south of the town of Kasaragod, Kerala, India. It also serves as an origination point for a road running east to Bandadka.

Transportation
National Highway 66 passes through Poinachi Junction which connects to Mangalore in the north and Calicut in the south. The nearest railway station is Kanhangad on Mangalore-Palakkad line. There are airports at Mangalore and Kannur.

Image gallery

References

Suburbs of Kasaragod